For the Summer Olympics, there were 33 venues starting with the letter 'H' and seven venues starting with the letter 'I'.

H

I

References

 List H-I